MFK Zvolen is a Slovak football team, based in the town of Zvolen. The club was founded in 1902. In summer 2014, MFK Lokomotíva Zvolen was merged with TJ Baník Ružiná and the club is eligible to play in the Slovak 2nd football tier. The club plays home matches at MFK Zvolen Stadium in Zvolen.

Current squad
Updated 24 February 2018.

For recent transfers, see List of Slovak football transfers winter 2017–18.

Notable players
Had international caps for their respective countries. Players whose name is listed in bold represented their countries while playing for MFK.

  Peter Grajciar

Notable managers
  Milan Albrecht
  Anton Jánoš (2014–17)
  Marián Süttö (2017–present)

For recent transfers, see List of Slovak football transfers summer 2015.

References

External links 
Official club website 

Football clubs in Slovakia
Association football clubs established in 1902
MFK Lokomotiva Zvolen